Jean Antoine Injalbert was born in Béziers in 1845 and died in 1933.  He was one of France's greatest sculptors. He worked in many of the great towns and cities of France and examples of his work can be seen in Paris, Pézenas, Reims, Montpellier, Sète etc. The son of a stonemason, Injalbert first served an apprenticeship with an ornamental sculptor,  then entered the École des Beaux-Arts in Paris in 1866 with a municipal scholarship.  His teacher was Augustin-Alexandre Dumont. In 1874 he won the Prix de Rome with a figure of Orpheus, and at the Éxposition of 1889 he won the Grand Prix. His first commission was to create the tympanum for La Chapelle du Bon Pasteur in Béziers.

List of works. "Marianne" and some Injalbert public works in Paris

Works by Injalbert in the Musée d'Orsay

This museum/art gallery has many works by Injalbert 

These include-

 "Ariane couchée"
 "Bacchante au Biniou"
 "Baigneuse"
 "Baiser"
 "Confidence"
 "Enfant"
 "Fondeur"
 "L'Hérault"
 "Satyre assis et Nymphe".
 "Satyre et Nymphe".
 "Satyre poursuivant une Nymphe".
 "Sibylle de Panzoult".
 "Supplication d'aprés Aubanel".
 "Triomphe de la République".
 "Vase orné de mascarons, de nymphes et de satyres".
 "Maitre Vigeant".
 "Poemes Idylliques Paiens".

Works by Injalbert in the Louvre

Injalbert public works in Béziers' Plateau des Poètes

Works in Béziers' Cimetière Vieux/The "Old" Cemetery

Many families in Béziers made good fortunes from the region's wine trade and were able to afford commissioning some of the day's top sculptors to work on their family tombs.

Other works in Béziers

Injalbert works in Montpellier

Other works outside of Béziers, Montpellier and Paris

Works held in Copenhagen's Ny Carlsberg Glyptotek

War Memorial

Gallery

References

Lists of works of art